David Rosenbloom is an American film and television editor with more than 20 film credits, as well as many television editing and directing credits. He was nominated for the Academy Award for Best Film Editing and the American Cinema Editors "Eddie" for The Insider (1999).

Life and career
Rosenbloom co-edited The Insider with William Goldenberg and Paul Rubell; the film was directed by Michael Mann. The three editors were interviewed by Scott Essman in 1999 about the making of The Insider. Rubell noted that, "the camera work is kind of chaotic. It is the opposite of what you would call a controlled visual style. The camera is always moving and it is very jittery and when you look at the dailies, you see that the operators had great latitude in what they could physically do with the camera; they tried some wild things and Michael loved that. He would sort of control the chaos and shape it, but he allowed the chaos to occur." Rosenbloom added, "I never worked with a director who gave such precise notes - the fact that the notes were precise and that there were so many of them made them imprecise because you couldn't possibly do everything that the note said to do. If you did, you would have 24 versions of the scene. The notes provided you with a road map and oftentimes the chaos in the editing was trying to figure out the one way that you could first put the scene together."

Rosenbloom's earlier television work garnered several additional Eddie and Emmy Award nominations. He has been elected to the American Cinema Editors.

Filmography
Film
 Best Seller (1987)
 Fresh Horses (1988)
 Quiet Killer (1992)
 Rudy (1993)
 A Pyromaniac's Love Story (1995)
 Moonlight and Valentino (1995)
 Primal Fear (1996)
 The Peacemaker (1997)
 Deep Impact (1998)
 The Insider (1999)
 Frequency (2000)
 Pay It Forward (2000)
 Hart's War (2002)
 The Recruit (2003)
 Friday Night Lights (2004)
 The Last Shot (2004)
 Dreamer (2005)
 The Break-Up (2006)
 Fracture (2007)
 Untraceable (2008)
 All Good Things (2010)
 Out of the Furnace (2013)
 Transcendence (2014)
 Black Mass (2015)
 Molly's Game (2017) (fired)
 Phil (2019)
 The Way Back (2020)

References

External links
 

American Cinema Editors
Living people
American television editors
Year of birth missing (living people)
American film editors